Bălăbănești is a commune in Galați County, Western Moldavia, Romania with a population of 2,080 people (2011). It is composed of four villages: Bălăbănești, Lungești, Bursucani and Zimbru. It also included two other villages until 2004, when they were split off to form Rădești Commune.

Natives
 Raicu Ionescu-Rion (1872–1895), literary critic and socialist commentator
 Gheorghe Tașcă (1875–1951), economist, lawyer, diplomat, politician, and a corresponding member of the Romanian Academy

References

Communes in Galați County
Localities in Western Moldavia